Cipaglucosidase alfa is an experimental enzyme replacement therapy medication for the treatment of glycogen storage disease type II (Pompe disease). Cipaglucosidase alfa is a recombinant human acid α-glucosidase enzyme replacement therapy that provides an exogenous source of acid α-glucosidase.

Society and culture

Legal status 
Cipaglucosidase alfa is available in the UK, since June 2021, under the Early Access to Medicines Scheme.

On 15 December 2022, the Committee for Medicinal Products for Human Use (CHMP) of the European Medicines Agency (EMA) adopted a positive opinion, recommending the granting of a marketing authorization for the medicinal product Pombiliti, intended for the treatment of glycogen storage disease type II (Pompe disease). The applicant for this medicinal product is Amicus Therapeutics Europe Limited.

Names 
Cipaglucosidase alfa is the international nonproprietary name (INN).

References

Further reading

External links 
 
 

Experimental drugs
Orphan drugs